Henry Arthur 'Harry' Dowdall (29 June 1872 – 9 May 1912) was an Australian rules footballer who played for Collingwood in the 1897 inaugural Victorian Football League (VFL) season.

Family
The son of James Dowdall and Isabella McGowan, Harry was small of stature and lightly built, and used these traits to his advantage, particularly in wet weather.

Football
Harry's older brother Jim had both previously played for South Melbourne in the Victorian Football Association (VFA) from 1887, with Harry playing in the 2nd Twenty. In 1892 they both tried to move to Collingwood. Jim was unsuccessful and instead played for Richmond.

In Collingwood's final game of the 1897 VFL season, Harry refused to play unless he was allowed to play on the ball for the entirety of the game. Although not pleasing Collingwood officials with his stance, he remained at the club for a further three seasons, playing 38 games and kicking 21 goals, before crossing to St Kilda in 1901 at the age of 29, where he played only one game.

Notes

References
 Football and fighting
 'Follower', "The Footballers' Alphabet", The Leader, (Saturday, 23 July 1898), p.17.
 Holmesby, Russell and Main, Jim (2007). The Encyclopedia of AFL Footballers. 7th ed. Melbourne: Bas Publishing.

External links
 

1872 births
South Melbourne Football Club (VFA) players
Collingwood Football Club players
St Kilda Football Club players
1912 deaths
Australian rules footballers from Melbourne
People from South Melbourne